Ermengard of Italy, also Ermengarda, Ermengarde, or Irmingard (852/855 – 897) was a queen and regent of Provence. She was the second and only surviving daughter of Louis II, Holy Roman Emperor.

Life
Born in around 852, she was the daughter of Louis II. In 855, Emperor Lothair I died, and her father became Holy Roman Emperor.

In 876, she married Boso, a Frankish nobleman who was related to the Carolingian dynasty and who rose to become King of Lower Burgundy and Provence in 879.

In May 878, she and her husband sheltered Pope John VIII, who was taking refuge from the Saracens, in Arles. After her husband's coup d'état in October 879, she helped defend his cities from her Carolingian relatives. In 880, she successfully defended Vienne itself, the capital, from the combined forces of Charles the Fat and the co-ruling kings of West Francia, Louis III and Carloman. In August 881, the newly crowned Emperor Charles the Fat pillaged and burned Vienne, forcing Ermengard and her children to take refuge in Autun with her brother-in-law Richard, Duke of Burgundy. Meanwhile, Boso fled into Provence.

On Boso's death in January 887, the Provençal barons elected Ermengard to act as regent of the kingdom, with the support of Richard. In May, Ermengard travelled with her son Louis to the court of Charles the Fat, and received his recognition of the young Louis as king. Charles adopted Louis as his son and put both mother and son under his protection. In May 889, she travelled to Charles' successor, Arnulf, to make submission anew.

Through her marriage to Boso, it is thought that Ermengard had two daughters and a son. These were:

 Engelberge/Ethelberga, married firstly Carloman II, secondly William the Pious; her mother is reported to have been Ermengard
 Louis the Blind (before 884 – June 5, 928), was betrothed to, and had a relationship with but possibly never married Anna/Eudocia Mamikonian, the illegitimate daughter of Zoe Zaoutzaina by Constantine VII. Later, he married Adelaide of Burgundy, the daughter of Rudolph I of Burgundy and his half-sister Guilla of Provence.

Ermengard died on 2 June 896 in Vienne, then part of the Frankish Empire, and was buried in the town's first Cathedral of Saint-Maurice. Her husband had been buried in the same cathedral in 887.

Notes

References

Sources

Carolingian dynasty
Burgundian queens consort
Queens consort of Lower Burgundy
9th-century women rulers
9th-century Italian nobility
Women in medieval European warfare
Women in war in France
850s births
897 deaths
9th-century Italian women
Women from the Carolingian Empire
Daughters of emperors
Daughters of kings
Queen mothers